A lower transverse plane midway between the upper transverse and the upper border of the pubic symphysis; this is termed the intertubercular plane (or transtubercular), since it practically corresponds to that passing through the iliac tubercles; behind, its plane cuts the body of the fifth lumbar vertebra.

Additional images

See also
 Transpyloric plane

References

External links
 http://medical-dictionary.thefreedictionary.com/_/viewer.aspx?path=dorland&name=plane(2).jpg

Anatomical planes